The Scottsboro Boys is a musical with a book by David Thompson, music by John Kander and lyrics by Fred Ebb. Based on the Scottsboro Boys trial, the musical is one of the last collaborations between Kander and Ebb prior to the latter's death. The musical has the framework of a minstrel show, altered to "create a musical social critique" with a company that, except for one, consists "entirely of African-American performers".

The musical debuted Off-Broadway and then moved to Broadway in 2010 for a run of only two months. It received twelve Tony Award nominations, but failed to win any. The previous record for nominations without a win was eleven, held by Steel Pier and the original production of Chicago, both also by Kander and Ebb. The musical's twelve nominations were second only to The Book of Mormon, which garnered fourteen nominations that year. Nevertheless, The Scottsboro Boys played in US regional theatres in 2012 and moved to London in 2013, where, after a sell-out production at the Young Vic, it moved to the West End in 2014.

Synopsis
As she is waiting for a bus, a lady lifts a corner of a cake box she's holding. As it brings back memories, the scene around her fades away, and the minstrels arrive ("Minstrel March"). The Interlocutor, the host of the Minstrel Show, introduces the players in the troupe, including Mr. Bones and Mr. Tambo, then begins the story of the Scottsboro Boys ("Hey, Hey, Hey, Hey!").

In 1931, Haywood Patterson, one of the nine boys riding in a boxcar on a train to Memphis, is ready to see the world ("Commencing in Chattanooga"). As the train is stopped, two white girls jump out, and two policemen recognize them as prostitutes. To get away, they accuse the nearby boys of rape ("Alabama Ladies"), and the boys are sent to jail. At their trial, their lawyer is drunk and mounts no defense, and Haywood, speaking for the boys, can only respond that he has done nothing. ("Nothin'") They are found guilty and are sentenced to death at Kilby Prison. Eugene, the youngest, has nightmares ("Electric Chair"). Awaiting execution, the boys long to return home ("Go Back Home").  Just as the executions are about to begin, the verdict is overturned. In  the North, the case has become a cause célèbre, and the Supreme Court has ruled the boys didn't have effective counsel. While the boys aren't free, they do get another trial ("Shout!").

A year later, they are still in prison. Haywood learns to write, and shares his short story ("Make Friends With the Truth"). The next trial gets under way in the spring of 1933. Public outrage over the trial has grown, especially in the North. They are given a New York lawyer, Samuel Leibowitz, to represent them to court ("That's Not The Way We Do Things").  During the trial, Ruby Bates, one of the girls, surprises the court and admits that the boys are innocent ("Never Too Late"). But, upon cross-examination, the Southern District Attorney makes antisemitic claims that Ruby Bates' change of heart was purchased by Leibowitz ("Financial Advice").

While the boys sit in a holding cell, waiting for the verdict, they talk about what they will do when the trial is over, believing that they can't be found guilty of crime that never happened. They talk about heading North, but the Interlocutor reminds them that they belong in the South ("Southern Days").  The boys are found guilty again and are sent back to prison. Haywood tries to escape in order to see his mother before she dies ("Commencing in Chattanooga (Reprise)"), but he's quickly caught.

As time passes, Leibowitz continues to appeal the verdict. In every trial, the boys are found guilty. Even the other girl, Victoria Price, begins to buckle ("Alabama Ladies (Reprise)"), tired of being dragged to repeated trials, but she never recants her testimony. One of the boys, Ozie Powell, is shot in the head after assaulting a guard and is left brain-damaged. By 1937, four of the youngest boys are released, but the other five remain in prison. Haywood wonders if he will ever get justice, and the Interlocutor advises him to be patient ("It's gonna take time"). Finally, Haywood is brought up for parole in front of the governor of Alabama, but will not be given parole unless he pleads guilty ("Zat So?") He defiantly refuses ("You Can't Do Me").  Haywood dies twenty-one years later in prison. As the show ends, the Interlocutor calls for the finale. The boys appear dressed in full-blown Minstrel attire and blackface, alternating between a high-energy closing number and solemnly relating how their experiences in prison left them unable to leave normal lives, leading to careers of unemployment, addiction, suicide and tragedy. The Interlocutor calls for the cakewalk, but the boys refuse, wiping off their make-up in defiance, and disappear. ("The Scottsboro Boys").

The scene fades back to the bus stop, just as the bus arrives. The lady, who is, in fact, Rosa Parks, boards the bus. The driver, who is revealed to be the Interlocutor, tells her to move to the back of the bus, but she refuses to comply.

Background 
In 2002, Susan Stroman first met with Thompson, Kander, and Ebb. The team began to "research the famous American trials" and found the Scottsboro Boys trial, which they thought was "a story that needed to be told." After Ebb's death in 2004, the project was put on hold. However, in 2008, Kander reapproached Stroman and Thompson, and the project continued. Kander finished writing the lyrics in Ebb's place.

Productions

Off-Broadway, 2010 
The Off-Broadway production opened at the Vineyard Theatre on March 10, 2010, with previews  starting on February 12, 2010. This was a limited engagement, which closed on April 18, 2010. Directed and choreographed by Susan Stroman, the original cast included John Cullum, Brandon Victor Dixon, and Colman Domingo. The creative team included sets by Beowulf Boritt, costumes by Toni-Leslie James, and lighting by Kevin Adams.

Minneapolis, 2010 
The musical opened at the Guthrie Theater, Minneapolis, Minnesota, starting July 31, 2010 and officially August 6 through September 25, with Susan Stroman as director and choreographer.

Broadway, 2010 
The musical began previews on Broadway on October 7, 2010, at the Lyceum Theatre, and officially opened on October 31, 2010, directed and choreographed by Susan Stroman. The Set Design was by Beowulf Boritt; Costume Design, Toni-Leslie James; Lighting Design, Ken Billington; Sound Design, Peter Hylenski; Orchestrations, Larry Hochman; Musical Arrangements, Glen Kelly; Music Direction and Vocal Arrangements, David Loud; Conducting, Paul Masse. This production closed on December 12, 2010, after 29 previews and 49 regular performances.

Regional productions
A Philadelphia, Pennsylvania, production of The Scottsboro Boys featuring several of the original Broadway cast members played at the Philadelphia Theatre Company in the Suzanne Roberts Theatre beginning on January 20, 2012. Stroman's original direction and choreography was replicated by Jeff Whiting. The limited engagement concluded on February 19, 2012.

A new production opened at San Diego's Old Globe Theatre on April 22, 2012, running until June 10, 2012.

The musical ran at the American Conservatory Theater, San Francisco, from June 21, 2012, to July 22, 2012.

SpeakEasy Stage produced the Boston premiere of The Scottsboro Boys in 2016. After an extended and remounted run, it won the Elliot Norton Award for Outstanding Musical Production, Midsize, Small or Fringe Theater.

The show made its Chicago premiere with Porchlight Music Theatre on February 7, 2017.

In May 2018, the musical opened at the Signature Theater in Arlington, Virginia.

Playhouse Theatre Group, Inc produced the Connecticut premiere In June 2019, at Playhouse on Park in West Hartford, Connecticut.  The Hartford Courant

London Off-West End 2013 and West End 2014 
A producer of the Broadway production, Catherine Schreiber, brought The Scottsboro Boys  to The Young Vic in London. The production, recreating Stroman's Broadway production, opened October 18, 2013. In January 2014 it received the Peter Hepple award for Best Musical, from The Critics' Circle. The production sold out, receiving "glowing" reviews. The show was nominated for six Olivier Awards in 2014 including Best New Musical.

The production transferred to the West End's Garrick Theatre for a limited run from October 4, 2014 to February 21, 2015. The production won Best Musical at the 2014 London Evening Standard Awards. The cast starred Brandon Victor Dixon as Haywood Patterson and featured Colman Domingo as Mr. Bones, Forrest McClendon as Mr. Tambo, James T. Lane as Ozie Powell and Julian Glover as the Interlocutor, with Music Supervision from Paul Masse. Brandon Victor Dixon was nominated in the 2015 Olivier Awards for Best Actor in a Musical.

Original Broadway cast
Joshua Henry - Haywood Patterson
Colman Domingo - Mr. Bones, Sheriff Bones, Lawyer Bones, Guard Bones, Attorney General, Clerk
Forrest McClendon - Mr. Tambo, Deputy Tambo, Lawyer Tambo, Guard Tambo, Samuel Leibowitz
John Cullum - Interlocutor
James T. Lane - Ozie Powell/Ruby Bates
Josh Breckenridge - Olen Montgomery
Kendrick Jones - Willie Roberson
Julius Thomas III - Roy Wright
Christian Dante White - Charles Weems/Victoria Price
Rodney Hicks - Clarence Norris
Jeremy Gumbs - Eugene Williams
Derrick Cobey - Andy Wright
Sharon Washington - The Lady (Rosa Parks)

Musical numbers
 Minstrel March – Orchestra
 Hey, Hey, Hey, Hey! – Company
 Commencing in Chattanooga – Haywood and Scottsboro Boys
 Alabama Ladies – Victoria Price and Ruby Bates
 Nothin' – Haywood
 Electric Chair – Guards, Eugene, Electrofied Charlie, and Electrofied Issac
 Go Back Home – Haywood, Eugene, and Scottsboro Boys
 Shout! – Scottsboro Boys
 Make Friends with the Truth – Haywood, Billy, and Scottsboro Boys
 That's Not the Way We Do Things – Samuel Leibowitz
 Never Too Late – Ruby Bates and Scottsboro Boys
 Financial Advice – Attorney General
 Southern Days – Scottsboro Boys
 Alabama Ladies (Reprise) – Victoria Price
 It's Gonna Take Time – Interlocutor
 Zat So – Governor of Alabama, Samuel Leibowitz, and Haywood
 You Can't Do Me – Haywood
 The Scottsboro Boys – Scottsboro Boys

The show is performed without an intermission.

Recordings
An original cast recording was released by Jay Records on April 23, 2010, featuring the 2010 off-Broadway cast. The Original London Cast Recording was released on May 26, 2015. Paula Marie Black is the executive producer.

Reception
The original off-Broadway production received mostly positive reviews. The New York Post'''s Elisabeth Vincentelli referred to it as "a masterwork, both daring and highly entertaining... Director/choreographer Susan Stroman has given it the best production possible at the intimate Vineyard Theatre. The book, score, and staging are so organically linked, you can't imagine one without the others." Steven Suskin of Variety praised the cast.

Reviews for the Broadway production were mixed (the median grade of 28 major reviews was a "B+"). While the show received mostly positive reviews, The Wall Street Journal called the show "a musical that slathers this terrible tale in a thick coat of musical-comedy frosting that has been spiked with cheap, elephantine irony. I can't imagine a nastier-tasting recipe."

The CurtainUp's reviewer wrote, "While The Scottsboro Boys has made the leap from a small downtown theater to Broadway without a stumble, the tricky question as to whether it will clear the financial hurdle of having to sell more and higher priced tickets, has yet to be answered. For all the singing and dancing, this is not a cheerful story, nor does it have sexy ladies or a romantic element. But neither is it the overly familiar standard fare geared to the tourist trade."

Ben Brantley, reviewing for The New York Times wrote, "With Scottsboro it is as if the events on which it is based are still too raw and upsetting to be treated with too much panache. Though it features some high-kicking dancing from its personable and industrious ensemble, this production gives the impression of always treading carefully, with furrowed brow, stooped shoulders and an accusatory glare."

John McWhorter of The New Republic panned the production, writing that "ideally, [this would be] a piece that grappled with the real story of the Scottsboro boys, a rich one driven by the conflicting impulses of desperate people with conflicting agendas. But the musical paints it in such broad strokes that it’s hard to engage with it on any substantial level." McWhorter concluded that "[i]f this thing were about Haymarket or Tiananmen Square we’d never have heard of it. The only reason The Scottsboro Boys has made it to the Great White Way is the Great White Guilt."

The score was generally well received by critics, with The Associated Press review saying, "Kander’s melodies are effortless, pouring out in a variety of styles from cakewalk to folk ballad to comic ditty. Ebb died in 2004, but here his clear, precise and often quite funny lyrics have been finished by Kander, and the transitions are seamless." McWhorter, however, disagreed, writing that "the Scottsboro score isn’t even much. One of John Kander and Fred Ebb’s least celebrated scores, Steel Pier, is Porgy and Bess compared to this one. Time passes for show music writers: the Scottsboro score is perhaps analogous to Cole Porter’s Aladdin or Jule Styne’s The Red Shoes. I would barely suspect Kander and Ebb had written this score if not told."

 Controversy 
On November 6, 2010, about thirty people gathered outside the Lyceum Theatre to protest The Scottsboro Boys, arguing that "the use of minstrelsy and blackface were racist." Stroman said she was disappointed that the protesters, who "probably had not seen the musical," had "misunderstood that the creators were not celebrating the minstrel tradition but rather using it to reveal the evils of the system." Weissler said the minstrel show is "not meant to demean or degrade anybody," but rather that it "houses the story we’re trying to tell."

Whoopi Goldberg addressed these protests on The View'', saying that "there's been a lot of protests all over New York against this show – a show that people have not seen. The people who are protesting this show, 90% of the people have not seen it. ... People are protesting saying that it shouldn't be a minstrel show, this is too serious. What people don't understand is that you have to bring information to people in a most invigorating way."

Awards and nominations

Original Off-Broadway production

Original Broadway production

Original London production

References

External links

 Internet Off-Broadway Database Listing
 IBDB Listing
 The Scottboro Boys at the Music Theatre International website
 Official website

2010 musicals
Off-Broadway musicals
One-act musicals
Broadway musicals
Musicals inspired by real-life events
Musicals by Kander and Ebb
Plays about race and ethnicity
Plays set in Alabama